Gerakas (previously known as ) is a community in the Xanthi regional unit of Greece. It is located 14 kilometers east of Stavroupoli and 14 kilometers northwest of Xanthi. The community consists of the settlements Gerakas, Isaia, Mega Evmoiro (formerly known as Emerli), Orestini and Pilima.

Population history

External links
Greek Travel Pages - Gerakas

Populated places in Xanthi (regional unit)